Amiga Disk File (ADF) is a file format used by Amiga computers and emulators to store images of floppy disks. It has been around almost as long as the Amiga itself, although it was not initially called by any particular name. Before it was known as ADF, it was used in commercial game production, backup and disk virtualization. ADF is a track-by-track dump of the disk data as read by the Amiga operating system, and so the "format" is really fixed-width AmigaDOS data tracks appended one after another and held in a file. This file would, typically, be formatted, like the disk, in Amiga Old File System (OFS).

ADF 
Most ADF files are plain images of the Amiga-formatted tracks held on cylinder 0 to 79 of a standard  double-density floppy disk, also called an 880 KiB disk in Amiga terms.  The size of an ADF will vary depending on how many tracks have been imaged, but in practice it is unusual to find ADF files that are not 901,120 bytes in size (80 cylinders × 2 heads × 11 sectors × 512 bytes/sector).

Most Amiga programs were distributed on double-density floppy disks.  There are also 3.5-inch high-density floppy disks, which hold up to 1.76 MB of data, but these are uncommon.  The Amiga also had 5.25-inch double-density disks.  The WinUAE Amiga emulator supports all three disk formats, but 3.5-inch double-density is the most common.

ADF files can be downloaded and copied to Amiga disks with the EasyADF application and various applications freely available on the Internet. As they are plain disk images, they can be handled by the Unix tool dd. On Linux and NetBSD, which support the most common Amiga filesystems, ADF files can be mounted directly.

There is a program called ADF Opus, which is a Microsoft Windows–based program that allows people to create their own ADF files.  This program supports creating double density (880 KB ADF files, the most common) and high-density (1.76 MB) ADF files.  ADF Opus also allows people to convert ADF files into ADZ files.

There is also a GPL command line program called unADF, which allows you to extract files from an ADF file.

The part of utility pack amitools contains a set of programs named xdftool.  It is under GPL and can read, write, format, and do other operations with ADF-images.

ADZ 
An ADZ file is an ADF file that has been compressed with gzip.  The typical file extension is .adz, derived from .adf.gz.

IPF 
The ADF file format can only store disks that have legal AmigaDOS format tracks. Disks with non-standard tracks may be available in ADF format, albeit cracked in order to create a regular AmigaDOS volume. However, the Amiga itself was not limited to storing data in these standard tracks. The Amiga's floppy disk controller was very basic but transparent, and for that reason very flexible allowing disks of other and custom formats to be read and written as well. Disk handling is not locked down like the one in a modern PC, and so most of the work to read and write disks is done by the operating system itself. However, because programmers did not have to use the operating system routines, it was quite normal for games developers to create their own disk formats  and also apply many different sorts of copy protection. As it was, most full-price commercial Amiga games had some form of custom disk format and/or copy protection on them. For this reason, most commercial Amiga games cannot be stored in ADF files unaltered, but there is an alternative called Interchangeable Preservation Format (IPF) which was specifically designed for this purpose.

The Software Preservation Society Interchangeable Preservation Format (.IPF) is an open format for which the source code of the official library is available.

DMS 
ADF files were sometimes compressed using the Disk Masher System, resulting in .dms files.

FDI 
FDI (from Formatted Disk Image) is a universal disk image file format specification originally published by Vincent Joguin in 2000. The FDI format is publicly documented, and accompanied by open source access tools. Because the format can store raw low-level data, as is for example required to support copy protection schemes and other non-standard formats, FDI files can be larger than disk image files in other formats. The typical file extension is .fdi. Because of the universal design of the FDI format, files in other disk image formats, such as ADF, ADZ and DMS, can in theory be converted to FDI.

See also

References 

Notes

 The .ADF (Amiga Disk File) format FAQ
 The Amiga Guru Book, Chapter 15, Ralph Babel, 1993
 Rom Kernel Reference Manual : Hardware, pages 235-244, Addison Wesley
 Rom Kernel Reference Manual : Libraries and Devices, Appendix C, Addison Wesley
 La Bible de l'Amiga, Dittrich/Gelfand/Schemmel, Data Becker, 1988.

Disk images
Amiga
Emulation software